The Algodoneros de Unión Laguna (English: Laguna Union Cotton Farmers) are a professional baseball team in the Mexican League based in Torreón, Coahuila.

History

Early years
The team was established in 1940 under the name Algodoneros de Unión Laguna, named for the Compañía Jabonera la Unión (Union Soap Company), the team's first sponsor. The team won its first pennant in 1942 under manager Martín Dihigo. The franchise moved to Nuevo Laredo in 1944, but an expansion club restored baseball to the region between 1946 and 1953. In the 1950 season, Laguna won their second and latest title to date, with Guillermo Garibay as manager.

1970–1981
With the creation of the Zona Norte in 1970, the Comarca Lagunera returned to the Mexican League. The new Algodoneros de Unión Laguna played their home games in Gómez Palacio, Durango from 1970 to 1974, and moved across the border to Torreón for the 1975 season with the construction of Estadio Superior, which reused the structure of the former Colt Stadium in Houston. The move coincided with new ownership, Don Juan Abusaid Ríos. The team won the Zona Norte in 1974, 1976, and 1978, but fell to the Diablos Rojos del México (1974, 1976) and Rieleros de Aguascalientes (1978) in the league championship. After the 1981 season and a falling out between ownership and Governor José de las Fuentes, Abusaid sold the team to the Sindicato de Trabajadores Petroleros de la República Mexicana (Union of Oil Workers of the Mexican Republic), which moved the franchise to Tampico, Tamaulipas. While the stadium was taken down in Torreón and moved to Tampico, the franchise spent the 1982 season in Monclova, Coahuila, as the Astros de Monclova.

1985–2003
In 1985, the Indios de Ciudad Juárez were bought by Jorge Dueñes Zurita and moved to Torreón, where the franchise has remained since. The team made the postseason in 1989, 1990, 1992, and 1994, but in their lone league championship appearance in 1990, they fell in five games to the Bravos de León. Unión Laguna was bought in 1997 by FEMSA-Cervecería Cuauhtémoc-Moctezuma, which sold the team in 2002 to Ricardo Martín Bringas, the director general of Organización Soriana.

Vaqueros Laguna

At the beginning of the 21st century, the new management opted to change the team's name and colors. The Vaqueros Laguna (Laguna Cowboys) donned orange uniforms beginning with the 2003 season. The team appeared in the playoffs in 2004, 2009, 2014, and 2015, the latter two years as the wild card.

Vaqueros Unión Laguna
The 2017 season marked a return to tradition for baseball in Torreón as the franchise restored the Unión Laguna name and switched back to maroon as its primary color.

Return to Algodoneros
The 2018 season further marked a return to tradition for baseball in Torreón, as the franchise restored the original name under which the club had been founded in 1940: the Algodoneros de Unión Laguna.

Among their best players in history are Miguel Gaspar, Guillermo Garibay, Pedro "Charolito" Orta, Moisés Camacho, Leo Rodríguez, Martín Dihigo, Jesus "Chanquilón" Diaz, Antonio Pollorena, and Héctor Espino.

Roster

Retired numbers
 6 Pedro Orta
 11 Guillermo Garibay
 21 Héctor Espino

References

External links
  

Baseball teams in Mexico
Torreón
Baseball teams established in 1940
Mexican League teams
1940 establishments in Mexico
Sports teams in Coahuila